Michael Cuellari (born July 16, 1985), better known by the ring name Q. T. Marshall, is an American professional wrestler signed to All Elite Wrestling (AEW) as a performer and producer. He is a co-owner and trainer of The Nightmare Factory (formerly known as One Fall Power Factory), a professional wrestling training facility, alongside Cody Rhodes and Glacier of Nightmare Family.

During his career he has worked with several independent promotions, most notably having sporadic appearances in Ring of Honor (ROH), as well as four matches with WWE. He also was the focus of a documentary about his tryout for the WWE named The Wrestler: A Q.T. Marshall Story, which has won Best Documentary at the 2017 San Diego Comic-Con Film Festival.

Professional wrestling career

Early career (2004–2012)
Marshall was trained at the Monster Factory before making his debut in 2004.

Ring of Honor (2012–2016)
After sporadic appearances for Ring of Honor, Marshall gained an ROH contract by defeating Matt Taven, Antonio Thomas, and Vinny Marseglia in a Four Corner Survival Match at Boiling Point 2012. Marshall was often paired with R.D. Evans as his manager or tag team partner as a comedy duo known as Marshall Law. Marshall made his last regular appearance for ROH in March 2016, teaming with Punisher Martinez to defeat Leon St. Giovanni and Shaheem Ali in a dark match.

WWE (2013–2017)
Prior to his WWE debut, Cuellari made his appearance for the WWE in 2011 during Extreme Rules with Cody Rhodes in his "undashing" gimmick handing out paper bags to the fans.

Marshall made his NXT debut (though not signed to a contract) on September 18, 2013 under the name Michael Q. Laurie, a play on his birth name, losing to Aiden English. On January 30, 2014, Marshall returned using his real name, teaming with John Icarino and losing to The Ascension. Marshall made another NXT appearance in 2016, losing to Baron Corbin in just over a minute. His last appearance came on March 29, 2017, going under the name Mike Marshall and teaming with Jonathan Ortagun to lose against the team of Otis Dozovic and Tucker Knight.

Ring of Honor (2017–2018)
Marshall returned to ROH at in July 2017, joining Ian Riccaboni and Colt Cabana on commentary during a match between Shane Taylor and Josh Woods. After the bout, Taylor attacked Woods at the behest of Marshall, who was revealed to be paying Taylor to do so. At the August 26 TV tapings  which aired in syndication over the weekend of September 23–24, Woods obtained his revenge by defeating Marshall in a regular match via submission to an ankle bar. Marshall reappeared at the February 10, 2018 TV tapings, which broadcast on the weekend of March 10, at Center Stage in Atlanta, Georgia, participating in a Battle Royal qualifier for an opportunity at the ROH World Television Championship, during which he would accidentally strike Taylor, by whom he would then be promptly eliminated.

All Elite Wrestling (2019–present)

Nightmare Family (2019–2021) 

In 2019, Marshall joined All Elite Wrestling (AEW) as a wrestler and associate producer. He made his AEW in-ring debut teaming with Peter Avalon on AEW Dark, losing to Dustin Rhodes and Sonny Kiss. He later debuted on the main show, AEW Dynamite, teaming with Alex Reynolds and John Silver, losing to Trent, Chuck Taylor and Orange Cassidy.

On the December 11 episode of Dynamite, Marshall teamed with Cody Rhodes in a losing effort against The Butcher and The Blade. A month later on the 15 January of Dynamite special episode at Bash at the Beach, he teamed up with Dustin Rhodes and Diamond Dallas Page to take on MJF and The Butcher and The Blade in a losing effort after MJF rolled him up for the win. On the February 19 episode of AEW Dark, Marshall teamed up with Dustin Rhodes once again against Shawn Spears and Peter Avalon, where they pinned Avalon after the pair combined (dominator/cutter) to win a match, earning Marshall's first AEW win since joining the company. During the post-event media scrum of AEW Revolution, Rhodes announced that Marshall would be his tag team partner, and hinted that they would begin using "The Natural Nightmares" as their team name. In May 2020, Marshall began a romantic storyline with Allie. On the June 2 episode of AEW Dark, Marshall arrived with Allie to the arena in a Corvette as she accompanied him to the ring for his match to Brandi Rhodes and Dustin Rhodes’s behest. On November 11, 2020 episode of Dynamite, "The Natural Nightmares" teamed up again to defeat Butcher and Blade in a Bunkhouse match.

The Factory (2021–2022)
On the March 31 edition of Dynamite, Marshall turned heel after attacking the Nightmare Family. He was joined by Anthony Ogogo, Nick Comoroto and Aaron Solow forming a splinter group called The Factory. At AEW Blood and Guts, Marshall lost to Cody Rhodes. At Revolution's buy-in show, Marshall lost to Hook.

Filmography

Television

Championships and accomplishments

Georgia Premier Wrestling
GPW Southern States Championship (2 times)
Jersey Championship Wrestling
JCW Championship (1 time)
IWA Puerto Rico
IWA Puerto Rico Heavyweight Championship (1 time)
Monster Factory Pro Wrestling
MFPW Heavyweight Championship (1 time)
MFPW Tag Team Championship (1 time) - with Punishment Martinez
 Pro Wrestling Illustrated
 Ranked No. 129 of the top 500 singles wrestlers in the PWI 500 in 2021
Southern Championship Wrestling Florida
SCW Florida Heavyweight Championship (3 times)

References

External links

1985 births
Living people
21st-century professional wrestlers
All Elite Wrestling personnel
American male professional wrestlers
People from Livingston, New Jersey
Professional wrestlers from New Jersey
Professional wrestling trainers
Sportspeople from Essex County, New Jersey
Television producers from New Jersey